Fallout was an American heavy metal band formed in 1979 based in Brooklyn, New York City. The band contained future Type O Negative members Peter Steele (then billed under his birth name, Peter Ratajczyk) on bass and vocals and Josh Silver on keyboards, as well as John Campos on guitars and  Agnostic Front drummer Louie Beateaux (then billed as Lou Beato) on drums. Fallout released only one record before the band's demise in 1982, the "Rock Hard" 7" single, released in 1981 on Silver Records and limited to 500 copies. This record was produced by Richard Termini and William Wittman.  

After three years of steady gigging, Fallout broke up. Peter and Louie went on to form Carnivore, and Josh and John formed Original Sin. After the breakup of Original Sin, John Campos went on to form his own production company: Powerhouse Entertainment Group, Inc.  John recorded, produced, and wrote songs for many independent and major label artists, such as Bret Reilly, Surfing Moses, Jennifer Marks, Alex Skolnick, the Tito Puente band, Jimmy Delgado, Fat Joe, Mink, and more. He now runs a studio and production company out of Astoria, New York called One Mind Music.

Past members 
 Peter Steele – bass, vocals
 John Campos – guitars
 Louie Beateaux – drums
 Josh Silver – keyboards

Discography
 Untitled 7" single (1981)

Other known songs that were recorded at Soundscape are "Parthenophagia", "Fallout", "Under the Wheels", "Executioner", "Bleed for Me" and an assortment of instrumental 'experiments' none of which have officially been released nor bootlegged. Fallout also recorded the first version of the 'World War Three' Soundscape as an introduction to the song "Fallout". This piece includes synthesized explosions, gunfire and sirens performed by Richard Termini on the Oberheim TVS-1 Synthesizer and recorded to analog tape. The Soundscape includes screams and death cries performed by the band, the roadies and their girlfriends. This 'World War Three' Soundscape was recreated by Termini for the band Carnivore and is on the self-titled album Carnivore (1985).

Track listing

Untitled 7" single
 "Rock Hard" (side A)
 "Batteries Not Included" (side B)

References

External links
 Extended Fallout biography
Batteries not Included and Rock Hard

Heavy metal musical groups from New York (state)
Musical groups from Brooklyn
Musical groups established in 1979
Musical groups disestablished in 1982